The Small Craft Insignia (more commonly known as the Small Craft Pin) is a military award of the United States Navy which was first created in the 1970s following the close of the Vietnam War.  The intent in creating the Small Craft Pin was to give recognition to the specially trained naval personnel who comprised the inshore boat units and river assault commands.

The Small Craft Pin (commonly called the 'Coxswain Pin' or 'Boat Pin' by U.S. Navy Sailors) is issued in two grades for both officers and enlisted.  The gold (officer) or silver (enlisted) metal pin consists of a small craft circumscribed by an anchor flukes on the sides and bottom and a three star pennant on top. The three stars represent the three main areas of U.S. Navy Riverine operations in Vietnam; OPERATION GAME WARDEN, OPERATION MARKET TIME, and OPERATION SEALORDS (Southeast Asia, Lakes, Oceans, Rivers and Deltas Strategy). The waves under the small craft represent the past, present, and future. The anchor represents the United States Navy. 

To qualify for the Small Craft insignia, a service member must complete full qualifications at every watch station of a small craft.  This normally includes positions as crewman/gunner, engineer, navigator, and coxswain. Enlisted personnel must be the Petty Officer in Charge (POIC) of a small craft for six months before they qualify.  Officers must hold the additional qualification of Watch Officer in order to be awarded the Small Craft Pin.  

Small Craft Insignia is also worn by Maritime Expeditionary Squadron (MSRON) Sailors and Coast Guard attached to MSRON squadrons after completion of the Tactical Craft Coxswain qualification. The Tactical Craft Coxswain is overall responsible for the safety of the craft and crew, as well as tactical movements, and weapons employment. The Tactical Craft Coxswain must complete the Tactical Craft Operations (TCO) PQS, as well as, attend various schools pertaining to navigation, tactical maneuvers, and defense tactics. The Tactical Craft Coxswain possesses weapons release authority and is the ultimate authority on board for all decisions, unless embarked with a Patrol Leader or SOPA (Senior Line Officer Present Afloat). Their authority comes from Article 1033 (Chapter 10 of ALNAV PRECEDENCE, AUTHORITY AND COMMAND) which states: "Authority in a Boat" Except when embarked in a boat authorized by the Chief of Naval Operations to have an officer or petty officer in charge, the senior line officer (including commissioned warrant and warrant officer) eligible for command at sea has authority over all persons embarked therein, and is responsible for the safety and management of the boat." As such, the Tactical Craft Coxswain is petty officer in charge of a boat authorized by the CNO and may not be relieved of command of the craft unless by their Patrol Leader, or authorizing Commander. 

Sailors who have earned the silver pin while enlisted and later become commissioned officers are authorized to begin wearing the gold pin (this is the only enlisted device that is authorized to change color upon the wearer's commissioning without further qualification).  The pin may be awarded, by default, to any officer given command of a unit which utilizes small boats, upon receipt of the Command Ashore Pin, regardless of previous qualifications.

The Small Craft Pin is authorized by local commanders and is not considered the same as a warfare qualification badge, such as the Surface Warfare Officer (SWO) insignia.  The Small Craft Pin may also be retroactively awarded to the Second World War, upon request of the service member to the Department of the Navy. 

The U.S. Navy maintains a similar pin, known as the Craftmaster Insignia, intended for those qualified in the operation of vessels such as Landing Craft Utility, Landing Craft Air Cushioned, large harbor tugs, and various other tugs and barges.  It is also awarded to certain staff officers and a few select midshipmen.

See also
List of United States Navy enlisted warfare designations
Badges of the United States Navy
Military badges of the United States
Obsolete badges of the United States military
Uniforms of the United States Navy

References

 "Awards and Decorations Instruction", Naval Coastal Warfare group one
 "https://www.secnav.navy.mil/doni/US%20Navy%20Regulations/Chapter%2010%20-%20Precedence,%20Authority%20and%20Command.pdf"

External links
 MILPERSMAN 1200-030: Small Craft Insignia

United States military badges
Military boats